Derek Thompson (born 4 April 1948) is an Irish  actor, most notable for playing Charlie Fairhead in the long-running BBC television medical drama series Casualty, playing the role since the series' inception in 1986, and his performance as Jeff in the British gangster film The Long Good Friday.

Early life
Thompson was born in Belfast and has a twin sister, Elaine Johns (née Thompson). During their teenage years, they combined to form the singing duo Elaine and Derek.  They recorded four albums and 15 EPs together, singing in harmonies, and released one eponymously titled album on the Parlophone label in 1961. They then formed the folk trio Odin's People with Larry Johns, and recorded two singles in 1967. Derek appeared in the feature film Gonks Go Beat (1965).

Career
In the mid-1960s, Thompson worked as Stage Manager in the Nonentities Theatre in Kidderminster. and in rep. In the 1970s he appeared in several productions at the National Theatre. In the late 1970s and early 1980s Thompson became a regular face in BBC and ITV dramas.  Appearances included Softly Softly, Play for Today, and Rock Follies of 77.  He got a big break in Harry's Game, where he played the lead IRA gunman on the run following the assassination of a government minister. Later he played another IRA hitman in the TV series The Price and for a British mercenary gang in the Wild Geese II, both filmed in 1985.

During late 1970s and early 1980s Thompson had minor film roles in Yanks (1979) and Breaking Glass (1980), and also played Jeff, Harold Shand's lieutenant, in the box office hit movie The Long Good Friday. Before he appeared in Casualty, he had a recurring role, as DS Jimmy Fenton, in the ITV police drama The Gentle Touch.

Casualty
Thompson began portraying Charlie Fairhead in Casualty in 1986. The following year he met his future wife, Dee Sadler, an actress playing the role of Maggie in an episode of the show's second series, a potholer who had to be rescued from a cave before hospitalisation. Thompson has currently played the role of Charlie for over 30 years, and is the only remaining character from the original cast. In 2004 his character went on a six-month sabbatical, which remains his most notable absence from the show. Currently, he is allowed a few months off from filming per year. Apart from Casualty, he has also played Charlie in the spin-off shows Holby City and HolbyBlue. It was revealed in July 2017, that Thompson was the BBC's highest-paid actor, earning between £350,000 and £400,000 over the last financial year.

Family
As of 2010, Thompson and his wife, Dee, lived in a rented flat in Bristol and also own a house in Brixton. The couple have a son, who appeared as a baby in one 1990 episode of Casualty as the son of regular character Duffy, and he also has an older son by a previous marriage to Christine, a theatre director.

A sufferer of dystonia, Thompson became patron of the Dystonia Society in 2006.

Theatre

 Strawberry Fields
 WC/PC
 The Bells of Hell
 The Garden of England
 Serjeant Musgrave's Dance
 The Cherry Orchard
 The Passion
 Dispatches
 The Mysteries
 Weapons of Happiness
 Lavender Blue
 Has Washington Legs
 School for Scandal

Selected filmography

References

External links

 

1948 births
Male film actors from Northern Ireland
Male television actors from Northern Ireland
Living people
Male actors from Belfast
20th-century male actors from Northern Ireland
21st-century male actors from Northern Ireland